Precht is a German family name.  Famous people named Precht include:

 Fred A. Precht, German-American painter
 Richard David Precht, German writer and journalist
 Precht (talk show), talk show on ZDF hosted by Richard David Precht